Little Nicky is a 2000 American fantasy comedy film directed by Steven Brill, written by Brill, Adam Sandler, and Tim Herlihy, and starring Sandler in the title role, Patricia Arquette, Harvey Keitel, Rhys Ifans, Tommy "Tiny" Lister Jr., and Rodney Dangerfield. The film depicts the son of Satan and an angel who is tasked with returning his two brothers to Hell and preventing them from destroying the boundary between good and evil on Earth.

The film received negative reviews from critics and was a box office bomb, grossing $58.3 million against an $80–85 million budget.

Plot
With his 10,000 year reign coming to an end and after torturing Adolf Hitler by shoving a pineapple up his rump, Satan must decide which of his three sons will succeed him as ruler of Hell. Adrian is the most devious, Cassius is the cruelest, and Nicky is the kindest. Adrian and Cassius claim that Nicky's mother is a goat and torment him by controlling his body with their minds. Nicky has had a speech impediment and a disfigured jaw since Cassius hit him in the face with a shovel. Satan assembles his sons to tell them that as they are not yet ready to succeed him, he will continue ruling Hell.

Angered by this decision, Adrian and Cassius travel to Earth to create a new Hell by possessing religious and political leaders in New York City. As they leave, they freeze the entrance to Hell, preventing more evil souls from entering and causing Satan to begin to disintegrate. Stanley the Gatekeeper informs Satan of this and Satan punishes him by growing breasts on his head and giving him to his father Lucifer. To stop Adrian and Cassius, he sends Nicky to Earth with a silver flask that traps whoever drinks from it inside.

Nicky has difficulty surviving on Earth and he is killed several times, landing in Hell and returning to New York each time. While learning how to eat and sleep, he meets a possessed, talking bulldog named Mr. Beefy, rents an apartment with an actor named Todd, and falls in love with a design student named Valerie Veran. Nicky encounters Adrian, but fails to capture him and scares Valerie away. Nicky then observes Cassius on television possessing the referee of a Harlem Globetrotters game. Nicky arrives at the game and successfully tricks Cassius into the flask. Satanist metalheads John and Peter swear loyalty to Nicky. That evening, Nicky apologizes to Valerie and they reconcile.

The following day, Adrian possesses the Chief of the NYPD and accuses Nicky of mass murder. Nicky has Todd kill him so he can go back to Hell and ask his father for advice, but Satan has trouble hearing because his ears have fallen off, and his assistants are panicking because the deadline to capture Adrian and Cassius is approaching. Back on Earth, Nicky and his friends devise a plan to capture Adrian in a subway station, but Adrian discovers their trick and, in the ensuing fight, grabs Valerie and dives onto the track as a train approaches, but Nicky throws her aside, leaving himself and Adrian to be killed by the train.

Arriving in Hell just minutes before midnight, Adrian begins taking over Hell by pushing what remains of his father aside and sitting on the throne, rising to Central Park, and starting a riotous party. Meanwhile, Nicky wakes up in Heaven as a reward for sacrificing himself and meets his mother Holly, an angel who tells him that he can defeat Adrian with the "inner light" that he inherited from her. After she gives him a mysterious orb, he confronts Adrian in Central Park where he covers Henry Winkler in bees. Adrian appears to win the battle by transforming into a bat and locking Nicky in the flask. However, Nicky escapes from the flask and shatters the orb, causing Ozzy Osbourne to appear, bite Adrian's head off, and spit it into the flask.

With his brothers captured, Nicky prepares to save his father. After he re-covers Winkler in bees to make sure he goes to Hell, he and Valerie express their love for each other and she kills him. In Hell, Satan regains his body and suggests Nicky stay with Valerie to maintain things in the middle while stating to Holly that he still loves her. In the presence of Nicky and Lucifer, Satan then shoves the flask containing Adrian and Cassius up Hitler's rump.

One year later, Nicky and Valerie live in New York with their infant son named Zachariah who has demonic powers.

A postscript states that Valerie struck Nicky with a shovel which fixed his jaw disfigurement. Satan and Holly continue their long distance relationship where Holly's fitness instructor is mentioned to be Chris Farley. Zachariah was suspended from the nursery after turning another kid's bottle of milk into moose urine. Todd started his one man show in which only a demon from Hell attended. Mr. Beefy reunited with his rat girlfriend and they had kids. Stanley the Gatekeeper and Gary the Monster also had kids of their own. John and Peter die in a plane crash and end up happily in Hell as honored residents who have been given Nicky's old bedroom to party in.

Cast

 Adam Sandler as Nicky, the youngest son of Satan and an angel named Holly.
 Patricia Arquette as Valerie Veran, a design student that Nicky falls for.
 Harvey Keitel as Satan, the ruler of Hell who is the father of Nicky, Adrian, and Cassius.
 Rhys Ifans as Adrian, the devious firstborn of Satan.
 Tommy "Tiny" Lister Jr. as Cassius, the brutish second son of Satan.
 Rodney Dangerfield as Lucifer, Nicky, Adrian, and Cassius's grandfather and Satan's father who created Hell.
 Robert Smigel as the voice of Mr. Beefy, a possessed bulldog and an old friend of Satan that Nicky befriends.
 Reese Witherspoon as Holly, an angel who is Nicky's mother.
 Allen Covert as Todd, an actor that Nicky befriends.
 Jonathan Loughran as John, a Satanist metalhead that befriends Nicky.
 Peter Dante as Peter, a Satanist metalhead and friend of John that befriends Nicky.
 Blake Clark as Jimmy, a demon who is one of Satan's advisors.
 Kevin Nealon as Stanley "Tit-Head", the Gatekeeper of Hell who Satan manifested breasts on top of his head after he mentioned that he couldn't stop Adrian and Cassius from leaving Hell.
 Dana Carvey as Whitey Duvall, the referee. Character credited as "Referee".
 Michael McKean as the unnamed Chief of Police whom Adrian possesses.
 Laura Harring as Mrs. Veronique Dunleavy, a woman who is spied upon by the Peeper
 Isaiah Griffin as Scotty Dunleavy, the son of Mrs. Dunleavy.
 Leah Lail as Christa
 Jackie Titone as Jenna
 Christopher Carroll as Adolf Hitler, the head of the Nazi Party who is condemned in Hell where Satan shoves a pineapple up his rump with him wearing a dress.
 Joseph S. Griffo as Evil Little Person
 Michael Deak as Gary the Monster
 Jess Harnell as the vocal effects of Gary the Monster

Cameos

 Lewis Arquette as a cardinal
 Ellen Cleghorne as a mother at the Globetrotters Game
 John Farley as Human Dartboard
 Clint Howard as Andrew/Nipples
 Jon Lovitz as The Peeper, a pervert who gets caught spying on Mrs. Dunleavy from a tree, is killed by Mrs. Dunleavy and Scotty when they throw a rock at him, and is condemned to Hell where he is chased by giant horny birds.
 Dan Marino as himself, he tries to sell his soul to Satan in exchange for his team's victory only to be declined when Satan considers himself too good to claim his soul.
 Ozzy Osbourne as himself, he is summoned by Nicky to bite the head off of Adrian's bat form.
 Regis Philbin as himself
 Radio Man as himself (Deleted scene)
 Rob Schneider as a Townie who witnesses Nicky's fight with Adrian. Schneider reprises his role from The Waterboy.
 Frank Sivero as an Alumni Hall Announcer
 Quentin Tarantino as a blind deacon that Nicky hits with water from a fire hydrant after he insulted Valerie.
 Bill Walton as himself
 John Witherspoon as a Street Vendor that briefly steals Nicky's flask.
 Carl Weathers as Chubbs Peterson. Weathers reprises his role from Happy Gilmore.
 Henry Winkler as himself, he gets covered by bees twice with the first one caused by Adrian and the second one caused by Nicky.
 George Wallace as Mayor Randolph, the Mayor of New York City that Cassius possesses.
 Fred Wolf as a Harlem Globetrotters fan.

Reception

Box office
It opened at #2 at the North American box office making $16 million USD in its opening weekend, behind Charlie's Angels, which was on its second consecutive week at the top spot. The film went on to earn $39.5 million domestically and another $18.8 million worldwide, bringing the total to $58.3 million.

Critical response
On Rotten Tomatoes, the film has an approval rating of 21% based on reviews from 114 critics, with an average rating of 3.9/10. The site's consensus reads: "Despite the presence of a large, talented cast, the jokes in Little Nicky are dumb, tasteless, and not that funny, and Adam Sandler's character is grating to watch." On Metacritic it has a score of 38% based on reviews from 29 critics. Audiences polled by CinemaScore gave the film a grade "B" on scale of A to F.

Comedian and former Mystery Science Theater 3000 host Michael J. Nelson named the film the worst comedy ever made. Roger Ebert of the Chicago Sun-Times gave the film a score of two-and-a-half stars out of four, describing Little Nicky as "the best Sandler movie to date" and the Nicky character as "intriguing", while at the same time lamenting Sandler's lack of finesse and vocal quirks.

In 2020, Evan Saathoff of /Film argued against the characterization of Little Nicky as being "a blight on [Sandler's] filmography", writing that Sandler "certainly never got this wild again, not in one of his own films at least."

Accolades
The film was nominated for five awards at the 21st Golden Raspberry Awards, including Worst Picture, Worst Actor (Adam Sandler), Worst Supporting Actress (Patricia Arquette), Worst Director and Worst Screenplay. It lost in all categories to Battlefield Earth starring John Travolta. At the 2000 Stinkers Bad Movie Awards, the film received seven total nominations: Worst Picture (lost to Battlefield Earth), Worst Actor for Sandler (lost to John Travolta), Worst On-Screen Couple for Sandler and that unfunny bulldog(lost to John Travolta and everyone in the galaxy for Battlefield Earth), Most Annoying Fake Accent for Sandler, Worst On-Screen Hairstyle for Sandler (lost to both Travolta and Forest Whitaker for Battlefield Earth), Most Annoying Product Placement for Popeyes Chicken (lost to FedEx and Wilson in Cast Away), and Most Unfunny Comic Relief for the painfully unfunny talking bulldog (lost to Tom Green for Road Trip and Charlie's Angels). As noted, its only win was for Most Annoying Fake Accent.

Home media
Little Nicky was released on DVD and VHS on April 24, 2001. The DVD includes two audio commentaries, a special feature dedicated to rock/metal music, the music video "School of Hard Knocks" by P.O.D., and deleted scenes.

Soundtrack

The soundtrack album, Little Nicky (Music from the Motion Picture), was released October 31, 2000, through Maverick Records and featured a lineup that leaned heavily toward Maverick recording artists that included Deftones, Insolence, Muse and Ünloco.

Notes
 Tracks 8 and 12 were not featured in the film

Some songs featured in the film, but excluded from the soundtrack, were "Ladies' Night" by Kool & the Gang; "Runnin' with the Devil" by Van Halen; "Flying High Again", "Mama, I'm Coming Home", and "No More Tears" by Ozzy Osbourne; "Does Anybody Really Know What Time It Is?" by Chicago; "Now or Never" by Zebrahead; Everlong" by Foo Fighters; "Two of Hearts" by Stacey Q; "Southtown" and "Rock the Party (Off the Hook)" by P.O.D.; "Rock You Like a Hurricane" by Scorpions; and "Highway to Hell" by AC/DC.

Video game

A Game Boy Color game was released based on the film shortly after its release.

See also
 List of films about angels

References

External links

 
 

2000 comedy films
2000 fantasy films
2000 films
2000s fantasy comedy films
2000 romantic comedy films
2000s romantic fantasy films
American fantasy comedy films
American romantic comedy films
American romantic fantasy films
Demons in film
Comedy crossover films
Cultural depictions of Adolf Hitler
Cultural depictions of Ozzy Osbourne
Cultural depictions of the Harlem Globetrotters
2000s English-language films
Fictional demons and devils
Films about angels
Films about dogs
Films about brothers
Films directed by Steven Brill
Films produced by Jack Giarraputo
Films produced by Robert Simonds
Films scored by Teddy Castellucci
Films set in hell
Films set in New York City
Films set in religious buildings and structures
Films with screenplays by Adam Sandler
Films with screenplays by Steven Brill
Films with screenplays by Tim Herlihy
Happy Madison Productions films
Little Nicky (franchise)
New Line Cinema films
Religious comedy films
The Devil in film
2000s American films